Regency Medical Centre is a multi-specialty hospital located on Aly Khan Road, in Dar es Salaam, Tanzania. Established in 1999, the hospital was founded by Dr. Rajni Kanabar, who was also the hospital's Chairman and the convener of the Tanzania Babies Heart Project till 25 June 2019.

References 

Dar es Salaam
Hospitals in Tanzania
1999 establishments in Tanzania